Packardia is a genus of moths in the family Limacodidae.

Species
 Packardia albipunctata (Packard, 1864)
 Packardia ceanothi Dyar, 1908
 Packardia elegans (Packard, 1864)
 Packardia geminata (Packard, 1864)

See also 
 List of Limacodidae genera

References 

 Synopsis of the Bombycidae of the United States. AS Packard, 1864
 Lepidopterological Notes and Descriptions: No. 2, Read October 9, 1865. AR Grote and CT Robinson, 1866
 Lepidopterological contributions. AR Grote and CT Robinson, 1866
 A Revision of the Species of Euclea, Parasa and Packardia, with Notes on Adoneta, Monoleuca and Varina ornata Neum. Harrison G. Dyar, Transactions of the American Entomological Society, Vol. 18, No. 2/3 (1891), page 156 (JStor Stable URL)

External links 
 
 
 
 Packardia at insectoid.info

Limacodidae
Limacodidae genera